The 2022 United States Senate election in Ohio was held on November 8, 2022, to elect a member of the United States Senate to represent the State of Ohio. Republican writer and venture capitalist J. D. Vance defeated Democratic U.S. Representative Tim Ryan to succeed retiring incumbent Republican Rob Portman. 

Vance won by a 6.1 point margin, but significantly underperformed every other statewide Republican candidate. Despite his defeat, Ryan flipped four counties carried by Portman in re-election in 2016: Summit, Montgomery, Hamilton, and Lorain, the latter of which Trump won in 2020. However, Vance scored wins in Ryan's home county of Trumbull and the industrial-based Mahoning County that contains much of Youngstown. Both counties were represented by Ryan in his congressional district.

Vance was endorsed by Donald Trump, and was the only candidate in the seven statewide general election races funded by Trump's PAC to win.

Republican primary
As a result of Portman's retirement, this primary was expected to be one of the most competitive in the nation. Due to his high approval ratings within the Republican Party, most of the candidates sought the endorsement of former President Donald Trump. Former State Treasurer Josh Mandel, who had been the Republican nominee for Senate in 2012, led most polls until late January, when businessman Mike Gibbons surged after spending millions in TV ads. At a forum in March 2022, Gibbons and Mandel got into a forceful argument over Mandel's private sector experience. The debate moderator interfered after it was feared the two candidates would come to blows. On April 9, Gibbons said that middle class Americans don't pay enough in income taxes, which immediately led to his poll numbers plummeting, and on April 15, Trump endorsed writer and commentator J. D. Vance, who had criticized him in the past.

Vance had been trailing in the polls, but as a result of Trump's support surged to become the race's frontrunner for the first time and led in most polls up to election day. Meanwhile, State Senator Matt Dolan, who disavowed Trump's claims of voter fraud in the 2020 United States presidential election, saw a late surge after buying ad time. Vance won with 32% of the vote with Mandel in second and Dolan in a close third. The primary was considered by many as a test of Trump's influence over the Republican Party as he won Ohio by 8 points in 2020. The primary was also the most expensive in the state's history, with the candidates spending a combined $66 million throughout the campaign.

Candidates

Nominee
J. D. Vance, author of Hillbilly Elegy, U.S. Marine Corps veteran, and venture capitalist

Eliminated in primary
Matt Dolan, state senator from the 24th district since 2017 and nominee for Cuyahoga County executive in 2010
Mike Gibbons, investment banker and candidate for the U.S. Senate in 2018
Josh Mandel, U.S. Marine Corps Reserve Iraq War veteran, former Ohio state treasurer (2011–2019), nominee for the U.S. Senate in 2012 and candidate for the U.S. Senate in 2018
Neil Patel, businessman
Mark Pukita, IT executive
Jane Timken, former chair of the Ohio Republican Party (2017–2021)

Withdrawn
John Berman, electronic hardware design, test engineer and candidate for U.S. Senate (Minnesota and Kansas) in 2020
Bernie Moreno, businessman

Disqualified
Bill Graham, attorney
Mike Holt
Michael Leipold, MedFlight pilot and retired U.S. Army chief warrant officer
MacKenzie Thompson, U.S. Air Force veteran

Declined
Troy Balderson, U.S. representative for Ohio's 12th congressional district (2018–present)
Warren Davidson, U.S. representative for Ohio's 8th congressional district (2016–present)
Anthony Gonzalez, U.S. representative for Ohio's 16th congressional district (2019–2023)
Jon A. Husted, lieutenant governor of Ohio (2019–present) (ran for re-election)
Bill Johnson, U.S. representative for Ohio's 6th congressional district (2011–present)
Jim Jordan, U.S. representative for Ohio's 4th congressional district (2007–present) (running for re-election)
David Joyce, U.S. representative for Ohio's 14th congressional district (2013–present) (ran for re-election)
John Kasich, former governor of Ohio (2011–2019) and candidate for President of the United States in 2000 and 2016
Mark Kvamme, co-founder of Drive Capital
Frank LaRose, Ohio secretary of state (2019–present) (endorsed Vance) (ran for re-election)
Rob Portman, incumbent U.S. Senator (2011–2023)
Vivek Ramaswamy, entrepreneur, author and businessman
Jim Renacci, former U.S. representative for Ohio's 16th congressional district (2011–2019) and nominee for U.S. Senate in 2018 (ran for governor)
Geraldo Rivera, journalist, author, attorney, and former TV host
Darrell C. Scott, pastor and CEO of the National Diversity Coalition for Trump (endorsed Moreno) (expressed interest in running for Ohio's 16th congressional district)
Steve Stivers, former U.S. representative for Ohio's 15th congressional district (2011–2021)
Pat Tiberi, former U.S. representative for Ohio's 12th congressional district (2001–2018)
Jim Tressel, president of Youngstown State University and former Ohio State football coach
Mike Turner, U.S. representative for Ohio's 10th congressional district (2003–present) (ran for re-election)
Brad Wenstrup, U.S. representative for Ohio's 2nd congressional district (2013–present) (ran for re-election)
Dave Yost, attorney general of Ohio (2019–present) and former Ohio state auditor (2011–2019) (ran for re-election)

Endorsements

Polling

Graphical summary

Results

Democratic primary

Candidates

Nominee
 Tim Ryan, U.S. representative for Ohio's 13th congressional district (2013–present) and candidate for President of the United States in 2020

Eliminated in primary

Traci Johnson, activist and tech executive

Disqualified
Demar Sheffey, treasurer of the Cuyahoga Soil and Water Conservation District
Rick Taylor
LaShondra Tinsley, former case manager for Franklin County Jobs and Family Services

Declined
Amy Acton, former director of the Ohio Department of Health
Joyce Beatty, U.S. representative for Ohio's 3rd congressional district (2013–present) (ran for re-election)
Kevin Boyce, president of the Franklin County board of commissioners and former Ohio State Treasurer
Kathleen Clyde, former Portage County commissioner, former state representative, and nominee for Ohio Secretary of State in 2018
John Cranley, former mayor of Cincinnati (ran for governor)
Michael Coleman, former Mayor of Columbus
LeBron James, professional basketball player for the Los Angeles Lakers and former player for the Cleveland Cavaliers
Zach Klein, Columbus city attorney
Danny O'Connor, Franklin county recorder and nominee for Ohio's 12th congressional district in 2018
 Aftab Pureval, attorney and Hamilton County clerk of courts (elected Mayor of Cincinnati in 2021)
Alicia Reece, Hamilton County commissioner
Connie Schultz, former columnist for The Plain Dealer and wife of U.S. Senator Sherrod Brown
Emilia Sykes, minority leader of the Ohio House of Representatives (ran for the U.S. House in Ohio's 13th congressional district) 
Nina Turner, president of Our Revolution, former state senator, and nominee for Ohio Secretary of State in 2014 (ran for the U.S. House in Ohio's 11th congressional district)
Nan Whaley, former mayor of Dayton (ran for governor)

Endorsements

Polling

Results

Third-party and independent candidates

Candidates

Declared
Stephen Faris, candidate for the U.S. Senate in 2018 (write-in)
John Cheng (write-in)
Matthew R. Esh (write-in)
Shane Hoffman (write-in)
Lashondra Tinsley (write-in)

Disqualified 
Shannon Marie Taylor (Libertarian)
Sam Ronan, United States Air Force veteran, candidate for Ohio's 1st congressional district in 2018, and candidate for chair of the Democratic National Committee in 2017 (Independent)
Eric Meiring (Independent)

General election
Ohio has trended Republican in recent years, voting for Republican Donald Trump by a large margin in the 2016 and 2020 presidential elections. As such, most analysts expected that this seat would easily remain in Republican hands. However, aggregate polling has found that the race is much more competitive than expected, and most outlets considered it to be “lean Republican”.

Predictions

Debates

Endorsements

Polling
Aggregate polls

Graphical summary

Josh Mandel vs. Amy Acton

Josh Mandel vs. Tim Ryan

Jane Timken vs. Amy Acton

Jane Timken vs. Tim Ryan

J. D. Vance vs. Amy Acton

Results
According to exit polls by the National Election Pool, Vance won the election (53% to 47%), winning majority of white voters (59% to 40%), while Ryan received majorities of Black vote (86% to 13%) and, to smaller extent, Latino vote (59% to 41%).

Results by county

By congressional district
Vance won 10 of 15 congressional districts.

Voter Demographics

See also 
 2022 United States Senate elections
 2022 Ohio elections

Notes

Partisan clients

References

External links 
 Official campaign websites
 Stephen Faris (I) for Senate
 Sam Ronan (I) for Senate
 Tim Ryan (D) for Senate
 J. D. Vance (R) for Senate

Ohio
2022
United States Senate